The 2011 UEMOA Tournament was the fifth edition of the competition.

Group A

Table

Results

Group B

Table

Results

Final

Squads  

 
2011 in African football
2011
2011
2011 in Ivorian football
2011 in Senegalese sport